Justified  may refer to:

 Justified (album), an album by Justin Timberlake
 "Justified" (song), a single by Kacey Musgraves
 Justified (TV series), an American television drama series
 "Justified" (A Day to Remember song), a 2016 song by Bad Vibrations
 "Justified?", a 1994 song by Sphere Lazza
 Maa Kheru (English translation: "Justified" or "True of Voice"), an ancient Egyptian epithet for venerable deceased

See also 

 Justification (disambiguation)
 Justifide, a Christian rock band, 1999–2003 
 Justify (disambiguation)